Rodney Harmon (born August 16, 1961) is a former professional tennis player the ATP.

Perhaps Rodney's greatest result came at the 1982 U.S. Open, during his Grand Slam debut, when he got through to the quarterfinals overcoming Rolf Gehring, Henrik Sundström, Scott Davis and Eliot Teltscher, seeded 8th, in an epic fifth set tiebreak. He lost to eventual champion Jimmy Connors in the quarterfinals. Harmon is featured on Tennis Channel's Tennis Channel Academy, where he stars in a 30-minute coaching show.

Rodney was only the second African-American man to have reached the U.S. Open quarterfinals, alongside legend Arthur Ashe until James Blake in 2005.

Rodney was named head coach of the Georgia Tech Yellow Jackets women's tennis team on July 3, 2012.

Career finals

Doubles (1 title)

External links
 
 
 Tennis Channel Profile

Living people
1961 births
African-American male tennis players
American male tennis players
Sportspeople from Richmond, Virginia
SMU Mustangs men's tennis players
Tennis people from Virginia
Georgia Tech Yellow Jackets women's tennis coaches
21st-century African-American people
20th-century African-American sportspeople
American tennis coaches